The Kurdistan Democratic Party of Syria (Kurdish: Partiya Demokrat a Kurdistanê li Sûriyê ;  Hizb Al-Dimuqrati ِAl-Kurdistani fi Suriya), commonly known as KDPS or PDK-S, is a Kurdish Syrian political party founded in 1957 by Kurdish nationalists in northern Syria. The party is based in Hamburg, Germany and has various branches in France, United Kingdom, Sweden and the United States of America.

History
The party emerged from former members of a literary club, which promoted the use of the Kurdish language and was dissolved in 1956. Following, Osman Sabri and Abdul Hamid Darwish began to plan for the establishment of a Kurdish party. Sabri began to formulate a party program in the Kurdish language together with Jalal Talabani, who at the time has settled in Damascus in exile.  Osman Sabri , Nûredin Zaza and Abdul Hamid Darwish, along with some other Kurdish politicians, founded the Kurdistan Democratic Party of Syria (KDPS) on the 14 June 1957. The parties secretary was Sabri , Nuredin Zaza became the first president in 1958. The objectives of KDPS were promotion of Kurdish cultural rights, economic progress and democratic change. KDPS was never legally recognized by the Syrian state and remains an underground organization, especially after a crackdown in 1960 during which several of its leaders were arrested, charged with separatism and imprisoned. After the failure of political union with Egypt in 1961, Syria was declared an Arab Republic in the interim constitution. During the parliamentary elections of 1961, the KDPS won no seats in the Syrian Parliament. On 23 August 1962, the government conducted a special population census only for the province of Jazira which was predominantly Kurdish. As a result, around 120,000 Kurds in Jazira were categorized as foreigners even though they were in possession of Syrian identity cards. In fact, the inhabitants had Syrian identity cards, which they were told to hand them over to the administration for renewal. However, those who submitted their cards received nothing in return. A media campaign was launched against the Kurds, with slogans such as Save Arabism in Jazira! and Fight the Kurdish threat!. These policies coincided with the beginning of Mustafa Barzani's uprising in Iraqi Kurdistan and the discovery of oilfields in the Kurdish-inhabited areas of Syria. In June 1963, Syria took part in the First Iraqi–Kurdish War by providing aircraft, armoured vehicles and a force of 6,000 soldiers against the Kurds. Syrian troops crossed the Iraqi border and moved into the Kurdish town of Zakho in pursuit of Barzani's peshmerga

KDPS went through several divisions in the 1960s. Mustafa Barzani (the father of Mesud Barzani, the current president of Iraqi Kurdistan) attempted to reunify the party by inviting all the factions to Iraqi Kurdistan in 1970. During the meetings, Miro was chosen (and later re-elected in 1972) as the chairman of KDPS.

Historian Jordi Tejel has identified "Greater Kurdistan" as being a "Kurdish myth" that was promoted to Syrian Kurds by the KDPS.

Syrian Civil War and Rojava Campaign 

The KDPS did not join the Syrian National Council at first, Secretary-General Abdulhakim Bashar seeing this body as too influenced by the country of Turkey. He demanded guarantees for the Syrian Kurdish population by the SNC and, in turn, stated Turkey's obligation to grant full rights to its own Kurdish population. Following disputes with the dominant Kurdish party in Syria, the Democratic Union Party (PYD), the KDP-S however later led the Kurdish National Council (ENKS) to join the SNC.

To counter the PYD's dominance in the Kurdish National Council (ENKS), the KDP-S set up an alliance named Kurdish Democratic Political Union in late 2012. The strategy however failed and even backfired ultimately driving other ENKS members into cooperation with the PYD. In early April 2014, the Kurdish Freedom Party in Syria (or Azadî), and three other parties merged into the KDP-S.

In Syria, the constitution states that political parties cannot be founded on ethnic, religious, regional and tribal basis, which has been one of the pretexts used to persecute Kurdish political organizations.

See also
List of armed groups in the Syrian Civil War

References

External links
Official site
Another official site

1957 establishments in Syria
Centrist parties in Asia
Kurdish nationalism in Syria
Kurdish nationalist political parties
Kurdish political parties in Syria
Liberal parties in Asia
Political parties established in 1957
Political parties in Syria
Political parties in the Autonomous Administration of North and East Syria